Migration is the debut studio album by drummer Antonio Sánchez which was released on the CAM Jazz label in 2007.

Reception

The Allmusic review stated, "Drummer Antonio Sanchéz's debut recording as a leader is an impressive outing". All About Jazz observed: "Antonio Sanchez's debut, Migration, deftly evokes the life of the desert as an allegory for the journey within all of us".

Track listing
All compositions by Antonio Sánchez except where noted.
 "One for Antonio" (Chick Corea) – 9:03
 "Did You Get It?" – 7:26	
 "Arena (Sand)" (Pat Metheny) – 9:32
 "Challenge Within" – 8:47
 "Ballade" – 6:31
 "Greedy Silence" – 10:55
 "Inner Urge" (Joe Henderson) – 9:29
 "Solar" (Miles Davis) – 4:36

Personnel
Antonio Sánchez – drums
Chris Potter – soprano saxophone, tenor saxophone
David Sánchez – tenor saxophone
Scott Colley – double bass
Chick Corea – piano (track 1)
Pat Metheny – guitar (tracks 3 & 8)

References 

2007 albums
Antonio Sánchez (drummer) albums
CAM Jazz albums